Nertsery Rhymes is a 1933 American Pre-Code musical comedy short film starring Ted Healy and His Stooges, released on July 6, 1933 by Metro-Goldwyn-Mayer. It is the first of five short films the comedy team made for the studio.

Plot
The Stooges play Ted Healy's children who refuse to go to sleep unless they are told a bedtime story. Healy first tries singing a comic version of The Midnight Ride of Paul Revere which ultimately fails putting the young lads to sleep. Healy's date, the Good Fairy (Bonnie Bonnell) then tells them her own bedtime story, courtesy of a musical revue.

The trio eventually turn in for the evening, only to have Curly request a second bedtime story. Healy and the Good Fairy then proceed to tell the children about The Woman in the Shoe. When that fails to work, a frustrated Healy smacks the three lads over the head with a rubber mallet, knocking them unconscious.

Cast
 Ted Healy - Papa
 Moe Howard - son 1
 Larry Fine - son 2
 Curly Howard - son 3
 Bonnie Bonnell - The Good Fairy

Uncredited cast
 Beth Dodge - Turn of a Fan Dancer
 Betty Dodge - Turn of a Fan Dancer
 Lottice Howell - Turn of a Fan Singer
 The Rounders - Woman in Shoe Quintet
 Ethelind Terry - The Woman in the Shoe

Production notes
Nertsery Rhymes was the first of three MGM Stooge-related shorts filmed using the two-color Technicolor process, originally billed as Colortone Musical Revues. This process would also be used in Hello Pop! (1933), again starring Healy, Bonnell and the Stooges, as well as Roast-Beef and Movies (1934), a film featuring Curly Howard's only known solo appearance apart from the Stooges. The use of color was predicated on the decision to build plot devices in Nertsery Rhymes around the following discarded Technicolor musical numbers from 1930 MGM films:
 "The Woman in the Shoe" from the musical Lord Byron of Broadway;
 "The Turn of a Fan" from the unreleased feature The March of Time.

References

External links

 
 
 
 Nertsery Rhymes on Dailymotion

The Three Stooges films
1933 films
1933 musical comedy films
Films directed by Jack Cummings
Metro-Goldwyn-Mayer short films
American musical comedy films
1930s English-language films
1930s American films